Edward M. Hundert is the Dean for Medical Education and the Daniel D. Federman, M.D. Professor in Residence of Global Health and Social Medicine and Medical Education at Harvard Medical School, where he is also Associate Director of the Center for Bioethics at HMS .  Hundert is a member of the TIAA Board of Trustees of TIAA-CREF.

Education 
Born in Woodbridge Township, New Jersey, Hundert was graduated from Yale University, summa cum laude, in 1978 with a degree in mathematics and the history of science and medicine, receiving Yale's annual Russell Henry Chittenden Prize “to the graduating senior with highest standing in mathematics and the natural sciences.” He attended Oxford University as a Marshall Scholar, earning a degree in philosophy, politics, and economics in 1980. He received his M.D. in 1984 from Harvard Medical School, where he remained to do his residency training in psychiatry at McLean Hospital.

Professional 
Hundert has spent most of his professional career at Harvard Medical School.  Following residency training, he was appointed Director of Postgraduate and Continuing Medical Education at McLean Hospital and became involved in the development of the Harvard's New Pathway Curriculum. He then served as Associate Dean for Student Affairs at Harvard Medical School from 1990 to 1997.  He left Harvard for nine years in his 40s, spending 5 years at the University of Rochester, where he served as Dean of the School of Medicine and Dentistry, and 4 years at Case Western Reserve University, where he served as president.  He left Case in 2006 after the faculty members in arts and sciences voted overwhelmingly that they lacked confidence in him due to mounting deficits at the university and a management style that many faculty members said was secretive.

He returned to Harvard Medical School to lead a new curriculum in medical ethics and professionalism and to serve as Director of the Center for Teaching and Learning until 2014, when he was appointed Dean for Medical Education to lead the development of Harvard's Pathways curriculum.

Publications
Hundert's articles on education, ethics, psychiatry, and philosophy have appeared in the Journal of the American Medical Association, the American Journal of Psychiatry, Academic Medicine, Psychiatry, Medical Education, and the Journal of Clinical Ethics.  His books include Philosophy, Psychiatry and Neuroscience: Three Approaches to the Mind (Oxford University Press, 1989) and Lessons from an Optical Illusion: On Nature and Nurture, Knowledge and Values (Harvard University Press'', 1995).

References

External links

Book: Philosophy, Psychiatry and Neuroscience: Three Approaches to the Mind
Book: Lessons from an Optical Illusion: On Nature and Nurture, Knowledge and Values
Edward Hundert's Harvard Center for Bioethics webpage
HMS profile page for Edward M. Hundert, MD 
Breakthrough Books: Lingua Franca (January/February 1996).
New Medical School Model Sets Out to Create More Competent, Caring Doctors.
University of Rochester names new deans: posts filled at School of Medicine;Nursing. 
Psychiatrist has Ambitious Plans as University President.
Lewin, Tamar: New York Times March 12, 2003, Universities learn value of neighborliness
News from the National Academies; April 8, 2003.
National Academy of Science Institute of Medicine Health Professions Summit.
Jaschik, Scott (March 17, 2006). "President Quits at Case Western". Inside Higher Ed.
Angelo, Jean Marie (April 2006) Case Western Searches for New Leader.
Taxel, Laura (May, 2006). “Idea Makers: Case Western’s Ed Hundert envisions a closer relationship between universities and their cities”.  Continental Magazine.
President’s Panel Focuses on University and the City; York University, May 15, 2006. 
Association of American Universities-American Council of Learned Societies, 2006.
Kazuo Inamori recognized by Dr. Hundert for Creation of Center for Ethics and Excellence.
Harvard Catalyst Profiles, 2009.
New Director of the Academy Center for Teaching and Learning, 2011

Presidents of Case Western Reserve University
Yale University alumni
Harvard Medical School alumni
Harvard Medical School faculty
Marshall Scholars
Bioethicists
Living people
Medical ethicists
People from Woodbridge Township, New Jersey
McLean Hospital people
Year of birth missing (living people)